Interstate 10 (I-10) is a transcontinental Interstate Highway in the United States, stretching from Santa Monica, California to Jacksonville, Florida. The segment of I-10 in California runs east from Santa Monica through Los Angeles, San Bernardino, and Palm Springs before crossing into the state of Arizona. In the Greater Los Angeles area, it is known as the Santa Monica Freeway and the San Bernardino Freeway, linked by a short concurrency on I-5 (Golden State Freeway) at the East Los Angeles Interchange. I-10 also has parts designated as the Rosa Parks Freeway and the Sonny Bono Memorial Freeway. Some parts were also formerly designated as the Christopher Columbus Transcontinental Highway. However, the California State Legislature removed this designation following the passage of a bill on August 31, 2022. I-10 is also known colloquially as "the 10" to Southern California residents .

Route description

The California Streets and Highways Code defines Route 10 from: (a) Route 1 in Santa Monica to Route 5 near Seventh Street in Los Angeles.(b) Route 101 near Mission Road in Los Angeles to the Arizona state line at the Colorado River via the vicinity of Monterey Park, Pomona, Colton, Indio, and Chiriaco Summit and via Blythe. Despite the legislative definition, Caltrans connects the two sections of the route by cosigning I-10 down I-5 between the East LA Interchange and the Santa Monica Freeway, negating a section of the San Bernardino Freeway west of I-5. This short section of Route 10 between Route 5 and Route 101, which was formerly defined as Route 110 (signed as I-110) until 1968, is signed overhead for I-10 eastbound and for U.S. Route 101 (US 101) westbound. This I-5/I-10 cosigning is consistent with the Federal Highway Administration's (FHWA) Interstate Highway route logs that such an overlap exists for the segment of I-10 in California.

I-10 is part of the California Freeway and Expressway System, and is part of the National Highway System, a network of highways that are considered essential to the country's economy, defense, and mobility by the FHWA. I-10 is eligible to be included in the State Scenic Highway System, but it is not officially designated as a scenic highway by the California Department of Transportation (Caltrans). The Santa Monica Freeway is Route 10 from Route 1 to Route 5, as named by the State Highway Commission on April 25, 1957. The section between the Harbor (I-110) and San Diego (I-405) freeways is also signed as the Rosa Parks Freeway, after the African American civil rights activist. The I-10 freeway is signed as the Christopher Columbus Transcontinental Highway in Santa Monica. However, the removal of this designation may result in the eventual removal of this signage.

Santa Monica Freeway
The Santa Monica Freeway is the westernmost segment of I-10, beginning at the east end of the McClure Tunnel in Santa Monica and ending southeast of downtown Los Angeles at the East Los Angeles Interchange.

I-10 begins its eastward journey in the city of Santa Monica after SR 1 turns east through the McClure Tunnel. Note that the McClure Tunnel is part of SR 1 in its entirety, and the western terminus of I-10 is to the east of the tunnel at 4th Street. SR 1 then exits onto Lincoln Boulevard and heads south while I-10 continues east. Soon after it enters the city of Los Angeles, I-10 has a four-level interchange with I-405. I-10 then continues through Sawtelle, Rancho Park, Cheviot Hills, Beverlywood, and Crestview in West Los Angeles; Lafayette Square and Wellington Square in Mid-City; and Arlington Heights, West Adams, and Jefferson Park into downtown Los Angeles. On the western edge of downtown at the Dosan Ahn Chang Ho Memorial Interchange, I-10 has an interchange with I-110 to the south and SR 110 to the north. I-10 then travels along the southern edge of downtown to the East Los Angeles Interchange.

At the East Los Angeles Interchange, SR 60 diverges east towards Riverside and Pomona. Then, I-10 heads east and merges with the traffic from the spur to US 101 onto the San Bernardino Freeway.

The freeway is 14 lanes wide (two local and five express lanes in each direction) from the Harbor Freeway (I-110) interchange to the Arlington Avenue off-ramp. Most of these lanes are full at peak travel times (even on Saturdays). The remainder of the freeway varies between eight and 10 lanes in width. The whole freeway opened in 1965 with four to six lanes, with a formal dedication held in 1966.

While the construction of the Century Freeway several miles to the south reduced traffic congestion to a considerable amount by creating an alternate route from downtown to the Los Angeles International Airport, the Santa Monica Freeway is still one of the busiest freeways in the world. All three freeway-to-freeway interchanges along its length are notorious for their congestion, and are routinely ranked among the top 10 most congested spots in the United States.

Due to the high traffic volume, car accidents are so common that Caltrans has constructed special accident investigation sites separated from the freeway by fences. These enable the California Highway Patrol to quickly clear accidents from the through traffic lanes, and the fences reduce congestion by preventing rubbernecking (in which vehicles slow down so their occupants can watch the accident investigation).

The Santa Monica Freeway is considered the border between West Los Angeles and South Los Angeles. Part of the freeway also skims the Byzantine-Latino Quarter, which is home to many immigrants affiliated with the Eastern Orthodox Church.

San Bernardino Freeway
I-10 heads east from the Downtown Los Angeles Eastside Los Angeles region to I-710 in Monterey Park. It then continues Alhambra, Rosemead, San Gabriel, El Monte, and Baldwin Park before intersecting with I-605. It then travels through West Covina and Covina before heading up Kellogg Hill into San Dimas, where I-10 intersects with SR 57 (formerly part of I-210) and SR 71 at the Kellogg Interchange. I-10 then heads east through Pomona and Claremont, leaving Los Angeles County to enter San Bernardino County.

In San Bernardino County, I-10 travels through Montclair, Upland, and Ontario, providing access to Ontario International Airport. I-10 then has a four-level interchange with I-15 before traveling through Fontana, Rialto, and Colton. I-10 then intersects with I-215, where the San Bernardino Freeway ends, before briefly entering San Bernardino city proper and traveling through Loma Linda and Redlands. In Redlands, I-10 intersects with the SR 210 freeway (future I-210) and with SR 38 before entering Yucaipa and eventually Riverside County.

Riverside County
In Riverside County, I-10 goes through Calimesa before entering Beaumont and merging with the eastern end of SR 60 (itself formerly the California segment of US 60). In Banning, I-10 has a diamond intersection with SR 243 before passing through San Gorgonio Pass between the San Bernardino Mountains and the San Jacinto Mountains (where the vegetation makes a rapid change between Mediterranean and desert ecology) and entering Palm Springs. The next  of the freeway, between SR 111 and Dillon Road, was named the Sonny Bono Memorial Freeway in 2002. Although I-10 intersects with the northern terminus of SR 111, the major artery to Palm Springs, it mostly bypasses the city, then connects to SR 62, a major east–west route through the Mojave Desert. I-10 cuts through Cathedral City and passes just outside the northern city limits of Rancho Mirage, Palm Desert, and La Quinta before entering Indio. I-10 then has an interchange in Coachella with the northern end of the SR 86 expressway, which also leads to SR 111.

Several miles east and roughly halfway between Indio and Blythe, in the community of Desert Center, I-10 intersects with SR 177, a turnoff that leads to the Desert Center Airport and connects to SR 62.  south of I-10 at the Wiley's Well exit, between Desert Center and Blythe, are the Chuckawalla Valley and Ironwood State Prisons. Near the Arizona state line, I-10 meets the terminus of SR 78. In the city of Blythe, I-10 runs concurrently with US 95 as both routes cross the Colorado River into Arizona.

I-10 westbound is usually signed as towards San Bernardino and/or Los Angeles in the Mojave Desert. Eastbound, in the San Gorgonio Pass, the signage indicates "Indio, Other Desert Cities", and indicates "Blythe" after Indio; the first sign for Phoenix does not occur until Indio.

Express lanes
The El Monte Busway is a grade-separated, shared-use express bus and high-occupancy toll (HOT) corridor running along the San Bernardino Freeway between Alameda Street near Union Station in Downtown Los Angeles and a point west of I-605 in El Monte. From Alameda Street to I-710, the El Monte Busway runs parallel to the north side of the freeway. After the I-710 interchange, these lanes merge back to the median of I-10. Eastbound buses exit the HOT lanes at El Monte Station west of I-605. Each vehicle using the HOT lanes is required to carry a FasTrak Flex transponder, with its switch set to indicate the number of the vehicle's occupants (1, 2, or 3 or more), regardless of whether they qualify for free.

Plans are to extend the HOT lanes from I-605 to Ford Street in Redlands. This expansion is planned in four phases. , the proposed segment in Los Angeles County between I-605 and the San Bernardino County line is under environmental review, the segment in San Bernardino County between the county line and Etiwanda Avenue at the Ontario–Fontana city limit is scheduled to be completed in 2023, the section to Pepper Avenue in Colton is planned to break ground in 2024, and the segment to Ford Street in Redlands is still in the planning stage.

History

What is now I-10 east of Los Angeles was generally part of the Atlantic and Pacific Highway, one of many transcontinental national auto trails. By 1926, when the United States Numbered Highways were assigned, the road across the desert east of Indio was unimproved, while the road from Indio west to San Bernardino (as well as various roads west to Los Angeles) was paved. In late 1926, US 99 was designated along the section of road from San Bernardino to Indio, where it turned south along present SR 86 on the west side of the Salton Sea. West of San Bernardino, US 99 ran to Los Angeles, concurrent with US 66 (via Pasadena) before turning north; this route to Los Angeles is north of the later alignment of I-10. The piece of this between San Bernardino and Indio was defined in 1915 as Legislative Route 26. (It continued south from Indio via El Centro to Heber. A 1931 extension took it south to Calexico on present SR 111.)

The route from Indio via Mecca to the Arizona state line near Blythe was defined in 1919 as pre-1964 Legislative Route 64. (Later extensions took LR 64 west along present SR 74; a 1931 cutoff bypassed Mecca to the north.) LR 26 was extended west from San Bernardino to Los Angeles in 1931, running along an alignment south of the existing US 66/US 99. Neither of these was a signed route until around 1932, when US 60 was extended west from Arizona to Los Angeles, running along LR 64 to Indio, LR 26 (with US 99) to Beaumont, pre-1964 Legislative Route 19 to Pomona, and LR 26 to Los Angeles. (The original alignment of LR 26 ran roughly where SR 60 now is west of Pomona, but an alignment close to present I-10 opened around 1934).

Thus, in 1931, what is now I-10 east of Los Angeles had been defined as LR 26 from Los Angeles to Indio and LR 64 from Indio to Arizona. It was signed as US 99 from San Bernardino to Indio, and US 60 came along around 1932 from Los Angeles to Pomona and from Beaumont to Arizona. US 70 was extended west from Arizona c. 1936 along the whole route to Los Angeles, and, between 1933 and 1942, US 99 moved from US 66 to present I-10 between San Bernardino and Los Angeles, forming a three-way concurrency between Pomona and Los Angeles. Old alignments and names include Valley Boulevard, Ramona Boulevard, and Garvey Avenue.

I-10 holds the distinction of being the first freeway in Los Angeles. A  section of today's freeway was built between 1933 and 1935 at a cost of $877,000 (equivalent to $ in ). The "Ramona Boulevard" highway linked downtown Los Angeles to the communities of the southern San Gabriel Valley. The roadway, which opened on April 20, 1935, was dubbed the "Air Line route", and was seen as a major achievement in traffic design.

The route east from Los Angeles was added to the Interstate Highway System on August 7, 1957. It was assigned the I-10 number on August 14, 1957, and the short piece west of I-5 was approved as I-110 on November 10, 1958. By then, most if not all of the San Bernardino Freeway had been completed, and I-10 was signed along the existing freeway along with US 70, US 99, and part of US 60. US 70 and US 99 were removed in the 1964 renumbering, while US 60 was removed in 1972, leaving only I-10.

The part west of downtown Los Angeles was pre-1964 Legislative Route 173, defined in 1933 from Santa Monica to downtown Los Angeles. It was signed as SR 26 by 1942, running primarily Olympic Boulevard. It was later replaced by the Santa Monica Freeway, and added to the Interstate Highway System on September 15, 1955. It too was assigned the I-10 number on August 14, 1957. It was completed c. 1964, and became Route 10 in the 1964 renumbering.

Portions of the Santa Monica Freeway going over La Cienega Boulevard collapsed after the Northridge earthquake on January 17, 1994, and were rebuilt using new Seismic-Resistant bridge designs.

The El Monte Busway was converted to high occupancy toll (HOT) lanes in 2013 as part of the Metro ExpressLanes project.

On July 19, 2015, a bridge carrying the eastbound lanes of I-10 near Desert Center collapsed from floodwater from the remnants of Hurricane Dolores, trapping a vehicle.

Juan Bautista de Anza National Historic Trail

The I-10 is part of the auto tour route of the Juan Bautista de Anza National Historic Trail, a National Park Service unit in the United States National Historic Trail and National Millennium Trail programs. In 2005, Caltrans began posting signs on roads that overlap with the historic 1776 Juan Bautista de Anza trail route, so that California drivers can now follow the trail.

Exit list

Spur to US 101

The legislative definition of Route 10 includes a spur from I-5 (the Golden State Freeway) west to US 101 (the Santa Ana Freeway) near downtown Los Angeles. This section of roadway, the westernmost part of the San Bernardino Freeway, was in fact part of the original San Bernardino Freeway, carrying US 60/US 70/US 99 long before the Golden State Freeway opened. It was added to the Interstate Highway System by 1958 as I-110, but in 1968 it was removed from the system, becoming a Route 10 spur.

This road is signed only for the roads it feeds into: US 101 northbound and I-10 eastbound. It has only two interchanges between its ends: a westbound exit off the spur at Mission Road immediately before merging with US 101 northbound, and the eastbound exit for State Street and Soto Street before it merges onto I-10 eastbound—this one is numbered (as exit 19). There is no direct access from the I-10 spur to I-5.

Exit list

Related routes
There are three auxiliary Interstate Highways associated with I-10 in California: I-110, I-210, and I-710. There is also one I-10 Business Loop at Blythe in Riverside County.

See also

 Lloyd G. Davies, Los Angeles City Council member, 1943–51, urged rail transportation on the Santa Monica Freeway

References

External links

Metro ExpressLanes – includes toll information on the I-10 Express Lanes
 Interstate 10, Interstate-Guide.com
 Interstate 10, California @ AARoads.com
 Interstate 10 highway conditions, Caltrans
 Interstate 10, California Highways
 Juan Bautista de Anza National Historic Trail official U.S. National Park Service website

10
 California
Interstate 10
Roads in Los Angeles County, California
Roads in Riverside County, California
Roads in San Bernardino County, California
Transportation in Los Angeles
Transportation in San Bernardino, California
San Gorgonio Pass
Coachella Valley
Colorado Desert
U.S. Route 99